Ückeritz is a municipality in the Vorpommern-Greifswald district, in Mecklenburg-Vorpommern, Germany.

A small coastal bathing resort, Ückeritz lies on the island of Usedom on the Baltic Sea. It is located within the Usedom Nature Park and is one of four spas called Amber Spas on the island, connected by a 12 km long fine sandy beach called Amber Beach. The other three amber spas are Loddin, Koserow and Zempin.

As of 2015, Ückeritz had a population of 1,007.

The place can be reached by federal highway B111 and has a station on the Usedom island railway.

References

External links 

Official website of Ückeritz (German)

Seaside resorts in Germany
Populated coastal places in Germany (Baltic Sea)
Vorpommern-Greifswald